Events from the year 1995 in North Korea.

Incumbents
Premier: Kang Song-san 
Supreme Leader: Kim Jong-il

Events
1995~1999:Arduous March
April 28–29, 1995:Pyongyang International Sports and Culture Festival for Peace(Aired in august 4)
May 1995: North Korean forces fire on a South Korean fishing boat, killing three.
October 1995: Two armed North Koreans are discovered at the Imjin River; one is killed.

References

 

 
North Korea
1990s in North Korea
Years of the 20th century in North Korea
North Korea